Moturoa / Rabbit Island is a small island that lies across the southernmost part of Tasman Bay / Te Tai-o-Aorere, on the northern coast of New Zealand's South Island.

It lies opposite the mouth of the Waimea River,  to the west of Richmond. It was formed about 7000 years ago as several barrier islands accumulated near the mouth of the Waimea River.  There is evidence of Maori occupation for over 800 years.  The original vegetation comprised tussock, manuka scrub and totara forest further inland.

The Rabbit Island Recreation Reserve contains three islands, Rabbit Island, Rough Island and Bird Island, and became a public reserve in 1908. Rabbit Island, with its long, safe swimming beach, is a popular beach resort to the residents of Motueka, Wakefield, Brightwater, Richmond, Māpua, Stoke and Nelson.

A medium-sized causeway spans a tidal area and joins the mainland to Rabbit Island. There is a large grassed area after this bridge and a Fire Hazard sign ("Keep it Green").  Large areas of the relatively flat islands are covered in pine plantation forest. The beach proper contains vast and mountainous sand dunes topped with masses of cone-bearing pines, with exposed roots, extending for long distances along the island.

The Tasman's Great Taste Trail, a cycleway running from Richmond to Motueka, runs through Rabbit Island. There is also a newly established equestrian area. The reserve area is closed to the public from dusk to 5 am.

In August 2014, the name of the island was officially altered to Moturoa / Rabbit Island.

Other islands with the same name

They are located (north to south):
 inside Whangarei Harbour, Northland Region 
 just west of Great Barrier Island, Hauraki Gulf 
 to the west of Kawau Island, north of Auckland 
 off the east coast of the Coromandel Peninsula, in Opito Bay 
 off the east coast of the Coromandel Peninsula, near Slipper Island 
 officially known as Motuotau Island, north of Tauranga, off the beach east of Mount Maunganui 
 Rabbit Island, a six-hectare islet close to Pitt Island in the Chatham Islands
 inside the entrance to Blueskin Bay, north of Dunedin 
 south of Riverton, in Foveaux Strait
 officially known as Rabbit Island Quarantine Island, near the centre of Bluff Harbour, Southland region

See also

 List of islands of New Zealand
 List of islands
 Desert island

References

Uninhabited islands of New Zealand
Islands of the Tasman District
Barrier islands
Tidal islands
Tasman Bay